Islington Chinese Association (依士靈頓華人協會) is a London based registered charity with an aim to promote social cohesion across the United Kingdom. It was formed in London Borough of Islington in 1986. It was incorporated as a limited company by guarantee in 1991  and was recognised as a registered charity in 1994. Their current chair is Mr Christopher Ng and prior to that the chairperson was Mrs Hanifah Law.

Their work in the community includes organising Chinese New Year celebrations which are attended by the various diverse communities in Islington and beyond and is one of the highlights of the calendar.

Award
In 2005, ICA was awarded The Queen's Award for Voluntary Service for "providing a multi-cultural resource centre for Chinese people and the wider community locally and nationally"。

Historical records
ICA's historical records between 1987 and 2007 are held by the London Metropolitan Archives, with catalogue number LMA/4506。

See also
 Chinese community in London

References

External links
 Official website: Islington Chinese Association
 Facebook page: Islington Chinese Association :: 依士靈頓華人協會

Chinese community in the United Kingdom
Organisations based in the London Borough of Islington
1986 establishments in England